O'Donovan Rossa GAA may refer to:

 O'Donovan Rossa GAA (Cork), a sports club in Skibbereen, Ireland

See also
 O'Donovan Rossa GAC (Antrim), a sports club in Belfast
 Ardboe O'Donovan Rossa GAC, a sports club
 Magherafelt GAC, a sports club occasionally known as O'Donovan Rossa Magherafelt